The Atlanta Magic were a soccer club that competed in the USISL from 1991 to 1996. The club originally started in 1991/92 in the indoor USISL league. They played in the 1992 USISL outdoor season as the Atlanta Datagraphic Magic, and the 1993 USISL outdoor season as the Atlanta Lasers. In 1995, they only played 2 games in the USISL Pro League, and they folded after the 1995/96 indoor season.

Year-by-year

Magic
Soccer clubs in Georgia (U.S. state)
Defunct soccer clubs in Georgia (U.S. state)
USISL teams
Defunct indoor soccer clubs in the United States
1991 establishments in Georgia (U.S. state)
1996 disestablishments in Georgia (U.S. state)
Association football clubs established in 1991
Association football clubs disestablished in 1996

References